Herochroma is a genus of moths in the family Geometridae. The genus was described by Charles Swinhoe in 1893.

Species
baba group
Herochroma aethalia (L. B. Prout, 1927)
Herochroma baba C. Swinhoe, 1893
Herochroma baibarana (Matsumura, 1931)
Herochroma crassipunctata (Alphéraky, 1888)
Herochroma crassipunctata crassipunctata (Alphéraky, 1888)
Herochroma crassipunctata farinosa (Warren, 1893)
Herochroma cristata (Warren, 1894)
Herochroma cristata cristata (Warren, 1894)
Herochroma cristata rubicunda Inoue, 1999
Herochroma curvata Han & Xue, 2003
Herochroma elaearia (Hampson, 1903)
Herochroma holelaica (L. B. Prout, 1935)
Herochroma nigrescentipalpis (L. B. Prout, 1916)
Herochroma ochreipicta (C. Swinhoe, 1905)
Herochroma pallensia Han & Xue, 2003
Herochroma perspicillata Han & Xue, 2003
Herochroma pseudocristata Inoue, 1999
Herochroma scoblei (Inoue, 1992)
Herochroma serrativalva (Holloway, 1982)
Herochroma sinapiaria (Poujade, 1895)
Herochroma subspoliata (L. B. Prout, 1916)
Herochroma subtepens (Walker, 1860)
Herochroma subviridaria (Yazaki, 1994)
Herochroma supraviridaria Inoue, 1999
Herochroma urapteraria (Walker, 1860)
Herochroma usneata (Felder & Rogenhofer, 1875)
Herochroma viridaria (Moore, 1868)
Herochroma viridaria viridaria (Moore, 1868)
Herochroma viridaria peperata (Herbulot, 1989)
Herochroma xuthopletes (L. B. Prout, 1934)
Herochroma yazakii Inoue, 1999
flavibasalis group
Herochroma aeruginosa Inoue, 1999
Herochroma clariscripta Holloway, 1996
Herochroma flavibasalis (Warren, 1894)
Herochroma hemiticheres (L. B. Prout, 1935)
Herochroma mansfieldi (L. B. Prout, 1939)
Herochroma rosulata Han & Xue, 2003

References

Pseudoterpnini
Geometridae genera